Denis St George Daly (5 September 1862 – 16 April 1942) was an Irish polo player in the 1900 Summer Olympics.

Biography
Denis St George Daly was the son of the second Baron Dunsandle and Clanconal  and Mary Broderick, but as his parents were unmarried at the time of his birth he could not inherit the title. From 1925 to 1934 he was Joint Master of the Heythrop Hunt. He was part of the Foxhunters Hurlingham polo team which won the gold medal.

He gained the rank of Major in the 18th Hussars. He held the office of Deputy Lieutenant for County Galway. He held the office of Justice of the Peace for Oxfordshire. He lived at Dunsandle, Atheny, County Galway, Ireland and at Over Norton Park, Chipping Norton, Oxfordshire, England.

References

External links

1862 births
1942 deaths
Military personnel from County Galway
Military personnel from Oxfordshire
People from County Galway
18th Royal Hussars officers
British polo players
Irish polo players
English justices of the peace
Polo players at the 1900 Summer Olympics
Olympic polo players of Great Britain
Olympic gold medallists for Great Britain
Place of birth missing
Place of death missing
Medalists at the 1900 Summer Olympics
People from Chipping Norton
Olympic medalists in polo